Hats Off may refer to:
 Hats Off (1927 film), a Laurel and Hardy film
 Hats Off (1936 film), directed by Boris Petroff
 Hats Off (2008 film), a documentary about Mimi Weddell
 Hats Off (Chet Baker album), a 1966 album by Chet Baker
 Hats Off (Roy Harper album), a 2001 album by Roy Harper
 Hats Off (EP), an EP by The Connells
 "Hats Off", a song by Alabama from the album Greatest Hits Vol. II
 "Hats Off", a song by Lil Baby and Lil Durk from the album The Voice of the Heroes
 "Hats Off", a song by Primus from the album Brown Album
 "Hats Off!", a song by Proud Mary from the album Love and Light